Bryan Catharina Anna Petronella Linssen (born 8 October 1990) is a Dutch professional footballer who plays for J1 League club Urawa Red Diamonds.

He formerly played for Fortuna Sittard, MVV, VVV-Venlo, Heracles Almelo, FC Groningen, Vitesse and Feyenoord.

Club career
Linssen made his professional debut in 2008 for Fortuna Sittard, the club where he spent much of his youth. He went on to play for MVV, VVV-Venlo, Heracles Almelo and FC Groningen, before signing for Vitesse in 2017.

Linssen scored 28 goals in 63 appearances in his first two Eredivisie seasons at the Arnhem club, an average of almost a goal every other match. He continued his fine form in front of goal last season, netting 14 times in 26 appearances before coronavirus hit and the Eredivisie was abandoned. That put him just one goal behind Steven Berghuis in the league scoring charts. In total, Linssen scored 47 goals and added a further 20 assists in 113 matches for Vitesse.

On 6 July 2020, Linssen signed a three-year deal with Feyenoord, joining on a free transfer from Vitesse. Linssen was Feyenoord's third signing of the summer after Mark Diemers and Christian Conteh.

After two seasons with Feyenoord, he signed with J1 League club Urawa Red Diamonds in a full transfer on 27 June 2022; the first overseas experience in his footballing career.  He made his unofficial debut for the Urawa Reds in a friendly match against Paris Saint-Germain on 23 July, replacing Yusuke Matsuo at half-time. His debut was short-lived, however, as he suffered a muscle injury just minutes into his debut, sidelining him for several months. He made his return to the pitch in his official debut for the club on 1 October, coming off the bench in the 63rd minute for Yoshio Koizumi in a J1 League match against Sanfrecce Hiroshima. He provided his first assist minutes later, extending a cross to Kai Shibato for a goal, as Urawa Reds lost 4–1.

Personal life
He is the younger brother of former professional footballer Edwin Linssen.

Career statistics

Honours
Feyenoord
 UEFA Europa Conference League runner-up: 2021–22

References

External links
 

Living people
1990 births
People from Leudal
Association football midfielders
Dutch footballers
Eredivisie players
Eerste Divisie players
Fortuna Sittard players
MVV Maastricht players
VVV-Venlo players
Heracles Almelo players
FC Groningen players
SBV Vitesse players
Feyenoord players
Urawa Red Diamonds players
Footballers from Limburg (Netherlands)
Dutch expatriate footballers
Expatriate footballers in Japan
Dutch expatriate sportspeople in Japan